Louis-Annibal de Saint-Michel d'Agoult (22 February 1747 – 17 December 1810) was a French general de division (brigadier general). He was an officer of the Legion of Honour, a knight of the Order of Saint Louis and a commander of the Order of Saints Maurice and Lazarus. He died in Spain.

References 
 
 
 
 
 .

1747 births
1810 deaths
Officiers of the Légion d'honneur
Knights of the Order of Saint Louis
Commanders of the Order of Saints Maurice and Lazarus